= Speed limits in Greece =

Road sign Π-65

The general speed limits in Greece are as follows:

General Speed limits
Type of road	Speed limit in km/h (mph)
Urban roads	30 (19)
Urban roads (2+ lanes)*	50 (31)
Rural roads	90 (56)
Expressways	110 (68)
Motorways	130 (81)

In build-up areas, the default speed limit is, unless otherwise posted:

- 30 km/h in general.
- 50 km/h on (i) one-way roads with at least two lanes, (ii) two-way roads with at least two lanes per direction and (iii) two-way roads divided by a median.
